Heather Stohler (29 November 1979 – 11 May 2008) was an American model. Born as Heather Stohler to Dave Goodwin and Angela Stohler, she was later adopted by her aunt and uncle, Ron and Jackie Arrick at the age of 4. When she entered modeling, she retained the name Stohler which was on her social security card that was never updated.

During her short career she worked on photoshoots with Kate Moss for Calvin Klein and also appeared on the covers of Vogue Italia, shot by Steven Meisel, and German Marie Claire. She also worked on several European catwalk shows.

Death

Stohler died on 11 May 2008 during a fire in her apartment. It is believed to be an accident. Stohler's boyfriend, Daniel Risley also died in the fire.

References

External links

1979 births
2008 deaths
American female models
Deaths from fire in the United States
Accidental deaths in Indiana
20th-century American women
20th-century American people
21st-century American women